David John Hacker (born 25 March 1964) is a British former field hockey player who competed in the 2000 Summer Olympics.

References

External links

1964 births
Living people
British male field hockey players
Olympic field hockey players of Great Britain
Field hockey players at the 2000 Summer Olympics
Place of birth missing (living people)